Barbour County is a county in North-Central West Virginia West Virginia, United States. At the 2020 census, the population was 15,465. The county seat is Philippi, which was chartered in 1844. Both county and city were named for Philip P. Barbour (1783–1841), a U.S. Congressman from Virginia and Associate Justice of the U.S. Supreme Court. The county was formed in 1843 when the region was still part of the state of Virginia.  In 1871, a small part of Barbour County was transferred to Tucker County, West Virginia.

The Battle of Philippi, also known as the "Philippi Races", was fought in Barbour County on June 3, 1861. Although a minor action, it is generally considered the first land engagement of the American Civil War.

Alderson Broaddus University, an American Baptist institution, is in the county. The university's Physician Assistant (PA) program is one of the world's oldest and best established.

History

Settlement and formation
The first white settlement in present-day Barbour County was established in 1780 by Richard Talbott – along with his brother Cotteral and sister Charity – about three miles (5 km) downriver from the future site of Philippi. At this time the region was still a part of Monongalia County, Virginia. The region had had no permanent Indian settlements and so conflicts with Native Americans were relatively infrequent in the early days. Nevertheless, the Talbotts were obliged to leave their homestead several times for safety and twice found it necessary to retreat back east of the Alleghenies, returning each time. No member of this eventually large family was ever killed by Indian attacks.

Over time, parts of the future Barbour County were included in the newly created Harrison (1784), Randolph (1787), and Lewis (1816) Counties. Barbour County itself was created in 1843 and named for the late Virginia politician and jurist Philip P. Barbour (1783–1841). (Barbour had served as a U.S. Congressman from Virginia, Speaker of the House, and Associate Justice of the United States Supreme Court.) The settlement of Philippi  – formerly "Anglin's Ford" and "Booth's Ferry" – was platted, named, and made the county seat in the same year; it was chartered in 1844. By the 1850s, when a major covered bridge was constructed at Philippi to service travellers on the Beverly-Fairmont Turnpike, the county's population was approaching 10,000 people.

The first newspaper in the county was the Barbour Jeffersonian, published starting in August 1857 and running only to about June 1861. It was put out by Thompson Surghnor (1820-1864).

Civil War
In April 1861, an Ordinance of Secession from the United States of America was approved throughout the state of Virginia in a referendum. Delegates from 25 western counties, however, assembled at Wheeling on 13 May for the first of a two meetings (see Wheeling Convention) called to repeal the Ordinance. The delegates from Barbour County for the first convention were Spencer Dayton, John H. Shuttleworth, and E.H. Manafee. Barbour County had voted in favor of Virginia's secession, though, and a palmetto secession flag had been flying above the courthouse since January, 1861.

On 3 June 1861, Philippi was the scene of one of the first battles of the American Civil War. The battle was later lampooned as the "Philippi Races" because of the hurried retreat by the Confederate troops encamped in the town. (The skirmish is reenacted every June during the town's "Blue and Gray Reunion".) At daylight on June 3, two columns of Union forces under the command of Col. Benjamin Franklin Kelley and Col. Ebenezer Dumont, with perhaps 3,000 men, arrived from Grafton and attacked about 800 poorly armed Confederate recruits under the command of Col. George A. Porterfield. The Union troops had marched all night through a heavy rain storm to arrive just before daylight. The surprise attack awakened the sleeping Confederates. After firing a few shots at the advancing Union troops, the Southerners broke lines and began running frantically to the south, some still in their bed clothes.

The Union victory in a relatively bloodless battle propelled the young Major General George B. McClellan into the national spotlight, and he would soon be given command of all Union armies. The battle also inspired more vocal protests in the Western part of Virginia against secession. On 11 June, the second Wheeling Convention met in that city and Barbour County was again represented by Dayton and Shuttleworth, who were this time joined by N.H. Taft. The Convention nullified the Virginia Ordinance of Secession and named Francis H. Pierpont governor. These events would eventually result in the separate statehood of West Virginia.

Later history
The economy and infrastructure in Barbour grew steadily, but slowly, through the late 19th century. Although the first railroad had reached nearby Grafton in 1852, a narrow-gauge railroad was not laid through the county until the early 1880s; a standard gauge line followed in the 1890s.

In 1990, private developers offered Barbour County citizens $4M to $6M annually in host fees to accept out-of-state garbage into a County landfill over the following three decades. Up to 200,000 tons of garbage per month would be delivered. (At the time, the county's annual budget was only about $1M.) County voters rejected the offer.

Registered Historic Places

 Belington
 Bernard E. Wilmoth House
 Berryburg
 Adaland, restored home of a 19th Century lawyer
 Carrollton
 Carrollton Covered Bridge
 Clemtown
 Ida L. Reed Homestead

 Elk City
 J. N. B. Crim House
 Philippi
 Barbour County Courthouse
 Peck-Crim-Chesser House
 Philippi B & O Railroad Station
 Philippi Covered Bridge
 Philippi Historic District
 Whitescarver Hall

Geography

Barbour County is situated on the Allegheny Plateau at the western edge of the Allegheny Mountains (represented by Laurel Mountain at the county's eastern boundary). Most of the county is drained by the Tygart Valley River which traverses it from south to north and on which its three largest settlements – Philippi, Belington, and Junior – are sited. Tributaries of the Tygart in the County include Teter Creek, Laurel Creek, Hacker's Creek, the Buckhannon River and the West Fork River. A portion of the County in the west drains into the Middle Fork River, principally through Elk Creek. Audra State Park – the county's only state park – is situated on the Middle Fork in the southwest corner. Teter Creek Lake Wildlife Management Area – the county's only WMA – is located on that stream and lake in the eastern portion. All of the mentioned streams are part of the greater Monongahela River watershed.

Major highways
  U.S. Highway 119
  U.S. Highway 250
  West Virginia Route 20
  West Virginia Route 38
  West Virginia Route 57
  West Virginia Route 76
  West Virginia Route 92

Adjacent counties
 Taylor County (north)
 Tucker County (east)
 Randolph County (southeast)
 Upshur County (southwest)
 Harrison County (west)
 Preston County (northeast)

Demographics

2000 census
As of the census of 2000, there were 15,557 people, 6,123 households, and 4,365 families residing in the county. The population density was 46 people per square mile (18/km2). There were 7,348 housing units at an average density of 22 per square mile (8/km2). The racial makeup of the county was 97.36% White, 0.49% Black or African American, 0.71% Native American, 0.26% Asian, 0.02% Pacific Islander, 0.12% from other races, and 1.03% from two or more races. 0.47% of the population were Hispanic or Latino of any race. In addition, the area has a significant population of racially mixed (though often light-skinned and blue-eyed) people, known locally as 'the Chestnut Ridge people', whose specific origins are uncertain. They are categorized by many scholars among the Melungeons found scattered throughout Appalachia.

There were 6,123 households, out of which 30.10% had children under the age of 18 living with them, 57.20% were married couples living together, 10.30% had a female householder with no husband present, and 28.70% were non-families. 25.10% of all households were made up of individuals, and 12.60% had someone living alone who was 65 years of age or older. The average household size was 2.47 and the average family size was 2.94.

In the county, the population was spread out, with 23.00% under the age of 18, 9.40% from 18 to 24, 26.80% from 25 to 44, 25.20% from 45 to 64, and 15.60% who were 65 years of age or older. The median age was 39 years. For every 100 females there were 96.70 males. For every 100 females age 18 and over, there were 92.00 males.

The median income for a household in the county was $24,729, and the median income for a family was $29,722. Males had a median income of $24,861 versus $17,433 for females. The per capita income for the county was $12,440. 22.60% of the population and 18.40% of families were below the poverty line. Out of the total population, 32.00% of those under the age of 18 and 16.70% of those 65 and older were living below the poverty line.

2010 census
As of the 2010 United States census, there were 16,589 people, 6,548 households, and 4,643 families residing in the county. The racial makeup of the county was 96.8% white, 0.7% black or African American, 0.6% American Indian, 0.2% Asian, 0.2% from other races, and 1.5% from two or more races. Those of Hispanic or Latino origin made up 0.6% of the population. In terms of ancestry, 23.4% were German, 22.3% were American, 13.6% were Irish, and 11.0% were English.

Of the 6,548 households, 30.7% had children under the age of 18 living with them, 54.8% were married couples living together, 10.9% had a female householder with no husband present, 29.1% were non-families, and 24.2% of all households were made up of individuals. The average household size was 2.46 and the average family size was 2.89. The median age was 41.5 years.

The median income for a household in the county was $31,212 and the median income for a family was $39,434. Males had a median income of $34,573 versus $21,797 for females. The per capita income for the county was $17,304. About 14.3% of families and 18.4% of the population were below the poverty line, including 27.5% of those under age 18 and 13.6% of those age 65 or over.

Politics

Economy
Major employment in Barbour County is provided by health care and social service sectors, retail, education, accommodation and food services, logging and wood product manufacturing, trucking and construction. The largest employers are Alderson Broaddus University and Broaddus Hospital.

Bituminous coal mining has been significant in Barbour; seven times as much tonnage has been produced from underground as by surface mining. Natural gas and oil wells provide a modest amount of employment. Wholesale lumber production (wood and wood products) is also present. (The county is a member of the West Virginia Hardwood Alliance Zone.) There is notable production of eggs and horse raising, but the major agricultural products are livestock, forage, dairy foods and orchard fruits.

Communities

City
 Philippi (county seat)

Towns
 Belington
 Junior

Census-designated places
 Century
 Galloway

Unincorporated communities

 Adaland
 Adma
 Arden
 Audra
 Bear Mountain
 Berryburg
 Boulder (Rangoon)
 Brownton
 Calhoun
 Carrollton
 Century Junction
 Claude
 Clemtown
 Corley
 Cove Run
 Dartmoor
 Dent
 Elk City
 Finegan Ford
 Gage
 Hall
 Hopewell
 Independence
 Jones
 Kalamazoo
 Kasson
 Kirt
 Lantz
 Longview
 Mansfield
 Meadowville
 Meriden
 Middle Fork
 Moatsville
 Mount Liberty
 Murphy
 Nestorville
 Overfield
 Peeltree
 Pepper
 Pleasure Valley
 Stringtown
 Tacy
 Talbott
 Tygart Junction
 Union
 Valley Bend
 Valley Furnace
 Vannoys Mill
 Volga
 Wellington Heights
 Werner
 West Junior

Minor civil divisions
In 1863, West Virginia's counties were divided into civil townships, with the intention of encouraging local government.  This proved impractical in the heavily rural state, and in 1872 the townships were converted into magisterial districts.  Barbour County's original magisterial districts were Barker, Cove, Elk, Glade, Philippi, Pleasant, and Union.  Between 1880 and 1890, part of Barker District was split off to form Valley District.  These eight districts continued until the 1970s, when they were consolidated into three districts: North, South, and West.

The names and boundaries of Barbour county's historic magisterial districts were preserved as assessment and tax districts, alongside the corporations of Belington, Junior, and Philippi.  The City of Philippi is divided into four wards, all of which are in Philippi District.  The first and second wards of Belington are in Valley District, while the second and third ward are in Barker District.

Notable natives and residents
 Ann Maria Reeves Jarvis (1832–1905), social activist who – along with her daughter Anna Marie Jarvis (1864–1948) – is credited with founding Mother's Day, lived in the county for several years
 William Smith O'Brien (Congressman) (1862–1948), born at Audra
 Ida Lilliard Reed (1865–1951), hymn writer
 Ted Cassidy (1932–79), actor who played Lurch and "Thing" on the 1960s TV show The Addams Family
 Larry Groce (b. 1948), noted singer and songwriter, lived near Galloway in the late 1980s

See also
 Chestnut Ridge people
 Barbour County Schools
 USS Barbour County (LST-1195)
 National Register of Historic Places listings in Barbour County, West Virginia
West Virginia
List of municipalities in West Virginia
List of counties in West Virginia
West Virginia statistical areas

References

Citations

Other sources
 Barbour County West Virginia...Another Look (1979), Compiled by The Barbour County Historical Society, Taylor Publishing Company, Dallas, TX and Paoli, PA.
 Coonts, Violet Gadd (2nd ed, May 1991), The Western Waters: Early Settlers of Eastern Barbour County, West Virginia, Assisted by Gilbert Gray Coonts and Harold Cart Gadd, Published by Stephen P. Coonts, Denver, CO.
 Coffman, Mary Stemple and Ethel Park Stemple (1978), Footsteps of Our Fathers: Early Settlers of Tacy (Barbour County) W. Va.; Baltimore.
 Hardesty's Historical and Geographical Encyclopedia, Illustrated: Containing large scale copper plate Maps of Each State and Territory of the United States, and the Provinces of Canada ... Special History of the Virginias, Maps and Histories of Lewis, Upshur and Barbour Counties, West Virginia ... Volume 4 of the series published by H.H. Hardesty, 1883, 391 pages. (Reprint edition edited by Jim Comstock; Subsequent reprint by Wes Cochran. Contains a brief history of Barbour County and biographical sketches of its citizens.)
 Mattaliano, Jane K. and Lois G. Omonde (1994), Milestones: A Pictorial History of Philippi, West Virginia, 1844–1994, Virginia Beach, Virginia: The Donning Company Publishers.
 Myers, Karl or Elmer (ca. 1935), One-Room Schoolhouses, 1 min. home movie of one-room Barbour County schoolhouses; West Virginia State Archives (Available on DVD set Treasures from American Film Archives: 50 Preserved Films, 2000).
 Shaffer, John W. (2003), Clash of Loyalties: A Border County in the Civil War, Morgantown, West Virginia: West Virginia University Press.
 Shingleton, George A. (1976), History of Mt. Morris School, Church and Cove District, Parsons, West Virginia: McClain Printing Company.
 Smith, Barbara and Carl Briggs (2000), Barbour County (Series: Images of America), Arcadia Publishing, Charleston, SC.
 Zinn, W.D. (1931), The Story of Woodbine Farm, Buckhannon, West Virginia: Kent Reger, Job Printer. (A detailed account of life and work on a Barbour County [Shooks Run] farm in the late-19th/early-20th centuries.)

External links
 Barbour County history sources at the West Virginia Division of Culture and History
 Barbour County Economic Development Authority
 Barbour County Schools
 Barbour County Fair Association
 WVGenWeb Barbour County
 Animal Friends of Barbour County – A No-Kill Shelter

 
1843 establishments in Virginia
Populated places established in 1843
Counties of Appalachia